Capell or Capel is a surname. Notable people with the name include:

Capell
 Arthur Capell, 1st Baron Capell of Hadham (1608–1649), English politician
 Arthur Capell, 1st Earl of Essex (1631–1683), English statesman
 Arthur Capell (1902–1986), Australian linguist
 Edward Capell (1713–1781), English critic (not to be confused with Edward Capel - see below)
 Ernest J. Capell, English amateur cyclist who in 1934 won the British Best All-Rounder competition
 Henry Capell, 1st Baron Capell (1638–1696), First Lord of the English Admiralty
 Peter Capell (1912–1986), German actor
 Robert Capell, 10th Earl of Essex (1920–2005)
 William Jennings Capell (born 1953), American retired grocery clerk, heir presumptive to the Earldom of Essex

Capel
 Arthur Boy Capel (died 1919), English polo player and lover and muse of fashion designer Coco Chanel
 Conner Capel (born 1997), American baseball player
 David Capel (1963–2020), English former cricketer
 Diego Capel (born 1988), Spanish footballer
 Edward Capel (1770–1855), English general and cricketer (not to be confused with Edward Capell - see above)
 Hans Capel (born 1936), Dutch physicist
 Jeff Capel II (born 1953), American National Basketball Association assistant coach and former college head coach
 Jeff Capel III (born 1975), American former college basketball player and coach
 John Capel (born 1978), American sprinter and college football player
 Mike Capel (born 1961), American former Major League Baseball pitcher
 Richard Capel (1586–1656), English nonconforming clergyman
 Thomas Bladen Capel (1776–1853), Royal Navy admiral
 Thomas John Capel (1836–1911), English scandal-ridden Roman Catholic priest
 Tommy Capel (1922–2009), English footballer
 William Capel (died 1515), Lord Mayor of London and Member of Parliament
 William Capel (sportsman) (1775–1854)

See also
Capel (given name)